Desh Pardesh was an annual arts festival in Toronto that focused on queer and South Asian culture. It ran from 1988 to 2001. Desh Pardesh's mandate was queer positive, feminist, anti-racist, anti-imperialist and anti caste/classist. The festivals main function was to provide a space of celebration for South Asian artists from underrepresented communities.

History 
Desh Pardesh translates to mean “home away from home,” and “at home abroad”. Its goals was to bring visibility and a voice to marginalized groups all the while breaking down the boundaries separating identities like race and sexual orientation. At the center of the Desh Pardesh festival was a drive for social change.  It was initially a single day event 200 attendees.  As popularity increased, Desh would go on to become an annual festival spanning the course of 5 days, hosting over 5000 attendees with a budget of $150,000.  The Festival consisted of film screenings, workshops, seminars, readings of literary work, performance art, as well as music and dance performances.  These programs were typically followed by a Q&A session with the presenting artists.  Desh also hosted discussion groups, exhibitions, workshops, networking sessions, receptions, and dance parties.  One out of the five evenings at the festival would be used to exclusively showcase queer programming.

Salaam Toronto (1988-1989)

The precursor to Desh Pardesh was the one day event “Salaam Toronto” and took place in 1988. Salaam Toronto was organized by Khush: South Asian Gay Men of Toronto, a queer collective activist organization in Canada for South Asian men and women. The initial idea came from director Ian Iqbal Rashid of Khush. The organization’s primary goal was to facilitate a deeper understanding of South Asian culture and values within the gay and lesbian communities. The founders were inspired by Caravan, a multicultural festival that started in Toronto in 1969 that celebrated the contributions of immigrants to Canada. Attendees dressed in traditional costumes and conducted cultural performances from their home countries.

Similarly, the queer community dressed in fanciful costumes and drag to celebrate and stimulate discussion surrounding its culture. More than an art event and meetup, the festival became an intersection of politics, culture, and activism that aimed to battle stereotypes of lesbians and gays within the South Asian community and to undo North American assumptions about South Asians. Nelson Carvello, a Khush member wrote regarding Salaam Toronto: "We wanted to expose our families to our realities as queer South Asians and at the same time we wanted to expose the white gay and lesbian communities to our lives in more than a tokenistic fashion. There was so much creativity and we had a lot of fun, but the vision was always about outreach - outward and inward"

Desh Pardesh (1990)

Salaam Toronto was officially renamed Desh Pardesh in 1990. Sharon Fernandez writes that "the complex histories of self-determination and resistance on the part of North America's feminist, civil rights, lesbian, gay, and Aboriginal movements that created a climate in which Desh could flourish."(cite) While the first festival aimed to celebrate diversity in many forms, some hopeful attendees felt that the festival needed to expand beyond a gathering of individuals in drag. this reinvention of the event was also influenced by the lack of gender diversity at Salaam Toronto. The emergence of Desh can also be attributed to the lack of visibility among people of color in the arts community. One of its goals was to bring information about the South Asian and gay communities to the public so that they might become educated on the intersection of these identities. Held at the Euclid Cinema, the second festival expanded towards creating a space within which South Asian arts could become launched in Canada, deviating from the first festival’s sole focus on the queer community. According to Punam Khosla, an event organizer and attendee, “all of the performances, there was like one lesbian, there was one queer project that was featured out of the whole day. Everyone else, all the other artists that were featured were straight and there was really bad politics in it.”

Conversations during the festival shifted towards discussion of South Asian culture in general, widening the purpose and scope of the Desh Pardesh. For example, there were readings of South Asian writers that focused key social issues of the South Asian community such as the differences and inequality in social perceptions and treatments towards South Asian women and men.

Desh Pardesh (1991-1995)

As Desh Pardesh drew in a wider audience within and outside of the South Asian community, there were concerns that the festival deviated from its original purpose of giving voice to the South Asian queer community. However, many artists like Pamila Matharu appreciated the intergenerationality of the festival. Because the festival had become more of a stable platform for cultural artists to penetrate into the mainstream, many artists participated in the festival in multifaceted ways, as artists, organizers, producers, and recruiters.

The 1991 Desh Pardesh program formed the core content for the first issue of Rungh Magazine. Volume 1, Number 1&2 of Rungh Magazine (launch in April 1992) included some transcriptions from the presenters at Desh Pardesh 1991, as well as other new content which intersected with and responded to the 1991 Desh Pardesh program.

Furthermore, while previous festivals focused primarily on social discourse, presentations, and performance art, Desh Pardesh (1993-1994) began to include visual art as an integral part of the festival.

Desh Pardesh (1996-1999)

As the Premier of Ontario (1995-2002), Mike Harris enacted significant funding cuts to welfare, education, and transportation programs that impacted the Greater Toronto Area. As a result, Desh Pardesh was affected by the budget cuts, which began to cause organizational issues for the festival.

Strong political agendas permeated into the festival organization and the administrative and board governance. There were conflicts between event leaders on who to invite based on their political agendas. Voices counter to the beliefs of the organizers were effectively silenced. For a festival that was intended to give voice, the credibility of the organizers and the event itself was tarnished.

Desh Pardesh (2000-2001 Final Year)

The demise of the annual Desh Pardesh was largely a result of financial shortfalls. Fatima Amarshi, the executive director at the time, estimated that $10,000 was immediately needed operating costs for the next three months, and $50,000 in the long run. Despite attracting around 4,000 attendees each year, the not-for-profit festival received little in terms of private sponsorships and grants from the government. Plans to reach out to corporations for donations, which were viewed as taboo by the festival community, ultimately failed to raise adequate capital, and the festival was discontinued starting 2001.

Programs 
Film Showcases

Showcasing of individually and non-commercially produced films that focus on common experiences of the South Asian queer community such as homophobia, isolation, exoticization and the colonial legacies of South Asian gays and lesbians living in the West.

Workshops included instructor-led activities, group discussions, performance-based expressions that centered on facilitating dialogue between members of the South Asian community and with the broader community.

Live Theatre

Live performances that reflected and refracted the lives of the South Asian queer community.

Live Theatre Example: “Raj, Raj, Against the Dying of the Light” (1990) (13)

A pun based on the famous line “Rage, rage against the dying of the light” in the poem Do not go gentle into that good night by Dylan Thomas. The performance at Euclid Theatre focused on the empowerment of the South Asian community against wider social and cultural forces.

At the Desh Pardesh Festival in Toronto, Canada was where Peeling the Banana's first international performance occurred. They performed a workshop at the 8th annual comprehensive South Asian diasporic “intra-national festival/conference”.

Public Readings

Live reading of works that explored the impact the race, religion, sexual orientation, communalism, fundamentalism, discrimination, and more from South Asian writers.

References 

South Asian culture
Festival organizations in North America
Queer culture